The Toronto Pan Am Sports Centre (TPASC) is a sports complex in Toronto, Ontario, Canada. Co-owned by the City of Toronto and the University of Toronto Scarborough, it is operated by TPASC Inc., with programming offered by both the university and Toronto Parks, Forestry & Recreation. It is located at the northern grounds of the university's Scarborough campus near the intersection of Highway 401 and Morningside Avenue in the suburb of Scarborough.

Opened to the public on September 2, 2014, the complex consists of a 3,500-seat aquatics arena (6,000 during the Pan Am and Parapan Am Games) with two Olympic-size swimming pools and a diving well; and a 2,000-seat field house that includes four full-sized gymnasiums, a fitness centre, a climbing wall, and a 200-metre track. The centre hosted diving, fencing, swimming, synchronized swimming and modern pentathlon competitions during the 2015 Pan American Games. Funding for the Toronto Pan Am Sports Centre is the largest single investment in amateur sports in the history of Canada.

History

The facility was funded by the Government of Canada, the Government of Ontario, the City of Toronto and the University of Toronto. In 2009, students at the University of Toronto Scarborough voted in favour of a 25-year levy which will contribute about $30 million to the facility. In 2011, the City of Toronto learned it had to contribute an extra $23 million for soil remediation on the former landfill. The whole facility cost about CA$205 million ($158 million to design and build it) which makes it the largest amount spent on amateur sport in Canada.

The official ground breaking for the facility was on 27 September 2012 and was attended by Toronto Mayor Rob Ford. The facility was announced then as the largest venue being built for the 2015 Pan American Games and represents the largest federal investment in amateur sport in Canadian history.

In addition to the 2015 Pan Am Games, the facility has hosted several other events for the North American Indigenous Games and the Invictus Games in 2017.

Design

The architect of the facility is David Clusiau. PCL Construction and NORR Ltd., signed a contract to design, build and finance the facility. The facility was designed by Counsilman-Hunsaker, the company that designed the 1996 Summer Olympics aquatic centre. The facility has been awarded Leadership in Energy and Environmental Design (LEED) Gold label.

Aquatics centre

The centre has three pools: the dive pool (25m), the competition pool (50m) and the training pool (50m). The competition pool has 3,500 seats. The facility doubles the number of Olympic pools in Toronto. The dive pool has three diving platform heights (3, 7.5 and 10 metres) and a dry diving training centre. The centre is the only aquatics facility in the area that meets international competition standards and the first facility with a warm-up pool. The competition pool is regarded as one of the fastest pools in the world. Public lane swim and leisure swim typically takes place in the training pool, while team practice and competition takes place in the competition pool. Ticket prices for lane swim are the same as other City pools.

Field house
The field house is adjacent to the aquatics centre and seats 2,000 people. The field house hosted fencing and modern pentathlon (fencing portion) events during the 2015 Games. The field house consists of three gymnasiums, a 200-metre indoor running facility, racquet sports courts and a centre for fitness which the entire school community can use. Moreover, the facility contains weightlifting equipment and a training area. It is also the home of the Canadian Sports Institute Ontario (CSIO). Starting in 2022, the field house will play host to home games for the Scarborough Shooting Stars of the Canadian Elite Basketball League.

Other facilities
The centre also has a climbing wall, a fitness centre, retail store, food and beverage, and 200m walking track.

Major competitions hosted

References

External links

Toronto Pan Am Sports Centre at the University of Toronto Scarborough
Toronto Pan Am Sports Centre at the 2015 Pan Am Games

University of Toronto buildings
University sports venues in Canada
Sports venues in Toronto
Buildings and structures in Scarborough, Toronto
Swimming venues in Canada
Venues of the 2015 Pan American Games
Venues of the 2015 Parapan American Games
2014 establishments in Ontario
Sports venues completed in 2014